Long-crowing chicken breeds are characterised by the unusually long-drawn-out crow of the cocks, which may in some cases last for up to 60 seconds. The oldest references to long-crowing cocks are from China. Long-crowing breeds are found in the Far East, in Turkey, in the Balkans and in western Germany.

History

The earliest reference to long-crowing cocks is in the writings of Li Ji, dating from the reign of Emperor Xuan of Han (75–49 BC). In Japan the first references are from the early eighth century, in the Kojiki and Nihon Shoki chronicles. The Bergische Kräher breed of Germany was imported from the Balkans in Mediaeval times. In Russia the Jurlower or Yurlov Crower was bred in the nineteenth century.

Characteristics

Chicken breeds which to a greater or lesser extent display long-crowing behaviour include the Berat, Bergische Kräher, Jurlower and Kosova Long Crower and breeds of eastern Europe, the Denizli of Turkey, and the Koeyoshi, Kurokashiwa, Tomaru and Tôtenko breeds of Japan.

In general, long-crowing breeds are tall, with long legs and neck.

Cock crowing contests
In Germany, Indonesia and Japan, there is an old tradition of cock crowing contests with local longcrowers. The length of a crow is measured, but also the number of crowing calls, the tone and melody can be judged. More recently, longcrower contests with nonlocal breeds are being organised in Germany and the Netherlands.

List of Longcrower breeds

 American Long Crower
 Achal Tekkinski
 Ayam Ketawa ("Laughing Chicken", also named "Ayam gaga")
 Ayam Pelung
 Bekisar
 Bergische Crower and Bergische Bantam Crower
 Brazilian Crower (Galo musico)
 Bosnian Crower (Berat Crower)
 Changkuo Crower
 Denizli Crower (Denizli horozu)
 Yurlov Crower (Jurlovskie golosistie)
 Kokok Balenggek (Ayam Kokok Balenggek)
 Komotini Crower
 Kosovo Longcrower
 Palama Crower
 Shôkoku
 Tômaru
 Tôtenkô
 Koeyoshi
 Kurokashiwa

References

Chickens
Poultry breeding